Dong Biwu (5 March 1886 – 2 April 1975) was a Chinese communist revolutionary and politician, who served as acting Chairman of the People's Republic of China between 1972 and 1975.

Early life 
Dong Biwu was born in Huanggang, Hubei to a landlord family, and received a classical education. In 1911 he joined the Tongmenghui, and participated in the Wuchang Uprising. He then went to Japan in 1913 to study law at Nihon University. While there, he joined Sun Yat-sen's newly formed Chinese Revolutionary Party, later to become the Kuomintang. In 1915, he returned to China, organizing resistance against the Yuan Shikai regime in his native Hubei, which landed him in prison for six months. Upon his release, he returned to Japan to complete his law studies. Between 1919 and 1920, he lived in Shanghai, where he was first exposed to Marxism through a group of Communist intellectuals centered around Li Hanjun. Returning to Hubei, he set up a local Communist apparatus, and in 1921, he attended the 1st National Congress of the Chinese Communist Party, representing Wuhan along with Chen Tanqiu. Incidentally, Dong was the only other person than Mao Zedong to be present at both the founding congress of the party and the proclamation ceremony of the People's Republic of China twenty-eight years later.

Revolutionary period

Throughout the first half of the 1920s, Dong remained a member of both the Kuomintang and the Communist Party; however, with the tensions between the two parties increasing, he eventually chose to side with the Communists in the summer of 1927. After the Nanchang Uprising, he was forced into hiding, first seeking refuge in Kyoto for eight months, and then making his way to the Soviet Union. There, he attended the International Lenin School and the Moscow Sun Yat-sen University between 1928 and 1931. Upon his return to China in 1932, he became active in the Jiangxi Soviet, where he served as Political Director of the Red Army Academy and President of the Party School. During this time, Dong sided with Mao Zedong over Li Lisan in the two men's struggle for party leadership. He then took part in the Long March, and upon the arrival in Yan'an, he resumed his school leadership duties. In this period, Dong came to be known as one of the Five Elders of Yan'an, along with Lin Boqu, Xu Teli, Wu Yuzhang, and Xie Juezai.

During the war with Japan, Dong divided his time between Wuhan and Chongqing as a liaison with the Nationalist government, given his previous Kuomintang associations. In 1945, he traveled to San Francisco to attend the founding session of the United Nations, as part of a delegation led by T.V. Soong. He was the only representative of the Communist Party, whose Central Committee outlined the objectives of the trip as follows: "to win foreign friends, to improve the party's international position, and to try to stay and work in the United States." After the conference, Dong spent several months traveling the United States, seeking to attain these diplomatic goals. Towards the end of the Civil War in 1948, following decisive victories in the north, Dong was appointed Chairman of the North China People's Government.

People's Republic of China

After the founding of the People's Republic of China, Dong served as the Director of the Finance and Economic Committee of the Government Council. In 1954, he was appointed President of the Supreme People's Court. With previous experience in international diplomacy from his visit to the United States in 1945, Dong was chosen to lead a delegation to Eastern Europe and the Soviet Union in 1958, keeping him away from Beijing for two months. In his absence, the work of the Supreme People's Court over the last previous years was reviewed by a group headed by Peng Zhen. On his return, Dong was presented with the shortcomings revealed by the scrutiny, for which he accepted responsibility at a special judicial conference.

In early 1959, Dong was named Vice President of China in a joint appointment with Soong Ching-ling, a post he held until his death. Later the same year, Dong defended Peng Dehuai from criticism at the Lushan Conference, yet still managed to stay in favor with Mao, unlike others who stood up for the reproached general. In a similar manner, Dong would later remain unaffected by the political turmoil of the Cultural Revolution, despite coming from a relatively privileged background. Instead, he rose in prominence and public visibility during these tumultuous years, taking over many of the diplomatic and ceremonial responsibilities previously held by the purged Liu Shaoqi. Historians have attributed this curious fact not to any cunning political maneuvering, but to Dong's special relationship with Mao and their always getting along well, ever since their first meeting at the founding of the Communist Party in 1921.

In the power vacuum that appeared after the fall of Lin Biao, Dong became Acting President of China, serving in that capacity from February 1972 to January 1975. At that point, the office of president was abolished and the Chairman of the Standing Committee of the National People's Congress - then Zhu De - became the formal head of state. Dong was in turn elected Vice Chairman of the Standing Committee of the People's National Congress.

Dong died in Beijing on 2 April 1975 at the age of 89. In his official obituary, he is described as "one of the founders of the Communist Party of China, a great Marxist, an outstanding proletarian revolutionary, a founding father of the People's Republic of China," and "a founder of China's socialist legal system."

In 1991, a statue of Dong was erected in one of Wuhan's central squares, Hongshan Guangchang. The Hubei Provincial Museum houses a collection of Dong's personal items.

References

External links 
  Biography of Dong Biwu

1886 births
1975 deaths
19th-century Chinese judges
20th-century Chinese heads of government
20th-century Chinese judges
Burials at Babaoshan Revolutionary Cemetery
Chinese Communist Party politicians from Hubei
Delegates to the 1st National Congress of the Chinese Communist Party
Delegates to the 5th National Congress of the Chinese Communist Party
Delegates to the 1st National People's Congress
Delegates to the 2nd National People's Congress
Delegates to the 3rd National People's Congress
Delegates to the 4th National People's Congress
First vice premiers of the People's Republic of China
International Lenin School alumni
Members of the 7th Politburo of the Chinese Communist Party
Members of the 8th Politburo of the Chinese Communist Party
Members of the 9th Politburo of the Chinese Communist Party
Members of the 10th Politburo Standing Committee of the Chinese Communist Party
Moscow Sun Yat-sen University alumni
People's Republic of China politicians from Hubei
Politicians from Huanggang
Presidents of the People's Republic of China
Secretaries of the Central Commission for Discipline Inspection
Supreme People's Court judges
Vice Chairpersons of the National People's Congress
Vice Chairpersons of the National Committee of the Chinese People's Political Consultative Conference
Vice presidents of the People's Republic of China